The 2000 Grand Prix of Texas was the seventh round of the 2000 American Le Mans Series season.  It took place at Texas Motor Speedway, Texas, on September 2, 2000.

Race results
Class winners in bold.

Statistics
 Pole Position - #77 Audi Sport North America - 1:12.716
 Fastest Lap - #77 Audi Sport North America - 1:12.912
 Distance - 474.995 km
 Average Speed - 171.920 km/h

References
 
 

Texas
Grand Prix of Texas
Grand Prix